Harold Hill Football Club is an English football club, based in Harold Hill in the London Borough of Havering. The club is affiliated to the Essex County Football Association.

History
The club joined the Essex Olympian League as Mountnessing in 1984.  Apart from one season in Division in 1988–89, they remained in Division Two until 2006, when they were promoted back to the top flight. In 2008, they were renamed Mountnessing Boca but reverted to just Mountnessing two years later.

In 2010, Mountnessing made their debut in the FA Vase, and a year later the club was renamed Harold Hill. The 2013–14 season saw the club gain promotion to the Premier division of the Essex Olympian League, as champions of Division One. The club spent two seasons in the Premier Division but were relegated back to Division one. The club then spent only one season in Division One, before leaving the league and moving to Division Two of the Mid-Essex Football League. Their first season in the Mid-Essex League saw them become champions, as well as win two cups.

Ground
The club plays their home games at Henderson Sports & Social Club, Kenilworth Avenue.

An unrelated club, also named Harold Hill that competed in the London League in the 1960s, played at St Neots Road in Harold Hill.

Honours

Essex Olympian League
Division One Champions (1) 2014–15
Mid-Essex Football League
Division Two Champions (1) 2018–19
Division Two League Cup Winner (1) 2018–19
Dave Strachan Knock-out Trophy Winner (1) 2018–19

References

Football clubs in England
1947 establishments in England
Association football clubs established in 1947
Parthenon League
Greater London League
Essex Olympian Football League
London League (football)
Mid-Essex Football League